Ardit Jaupaj (born 6 June 1996) is an Albanian professional footballer who currently plays for Egnatia Rrogozhinë in the Albanian First Division.

References

1996 births
Living people
People from Kuçovë
Association football forwards
Albanian footballers
Albania youth international footballers
FK Partizani Tirana players
KF Olimpik Tirana players
KS Sopoti Librazhd players
KF Flamurtari players
KF Feronikeli players
KF Bylis Ballsh players
KS Egnatia Rrogozhinë players
Kategoria Superiore players
Kategoria e Parë players
Kategoria e Dytë players
Football Superleague of Kosovo players
Albanian expatriate footballers
Expatriate footballers in Kosovo
Albanian expatriate sportspeople in Kosovo